16 Serpentis is a binary star system in the Serpens Caput portion of the equatorial constellation of Serpens, located 228 light years from the Sun. It is visible to the naked eye as a fain, orange-hued star with an apparent visual magnitude of 5.261. The system is moving further from the Earth with a heliocentric radial velocity of +3 km/s.

The variable radial velocity of this star was discovered at Lick Observatory and was announced by J. H. Moore in 1924. This is a mild barium star with the suffix notation above indicating associated abundance anomalies. The companion is a presumed white dwarf star that has already passed through its giant stage, during which time it enhanced the envelope of the companion with s-process elements. The pair form one of the widest barium star binaries known, which may account for the mildness of the barium anomaly.

References

K-type giants
Barium stars
Spectroscopic binaries
Serpens (constellation)
Durchmusterung objects
Serpentis, 16
139195
076425
5802